Guru En Aalu is a 2009 Indian Tamil-language romantic comedy film directed by Selva and produced by K. R. Gangadharan. It stars Madhavan, Abbas and Mamta Mohandas in the leading roles, while Vivek and Brinda Parekh portray supporting roles. The film was a remake of Aziz Mirza's 1997 Hindi film Yes Boss starring Shahrukh Khan. The music was composed by Srikanth Deva with cinematography by U. K. Senthil Kumar and editing by V. T. Vijayan. The film began production in late 2007 and released on 24 April 2009 to mixed reviews.

Plot
Guru (Madhavan) is the ambitious assistant of his playboy boss Krishna(Abbas), who is the CEO of a big chain of companies. Krishna is a charismatic and successful businessman who in spite of being married to Sheila, a beautiful woman (Brinda Parekh), has affairs with numerous women and relies on Guru to keep up his image of a doting husband. Guru is promised by Krishna to make him as the head of one of his companies. Guru is loggerheads with Seema, a beautiful woman he encounters during a road traffic. The duo later become friends. Guru goes along in the hope of being promoted. His goal is to become a rich man against all odds. Azhagappan (Vivek) is a fraudulent Yoga master, who earns money in the name of Yoga. Guru tries to maintain Krishna's image during Krishna and Seema's anniversary while Krishna is busy with his one night stand with another woman. After seeing the model Seema (Mamta Mohandas) at a fashion show, Krishna instantly is smitten by her and requests Guru to arrange opportunities to meet with her leaving Guru fuming for he had also fallen in love with Seema. Seema laters receives award as the best ramp model from Krishna. Krishna asks Guru to sign Seema as the model for 'lux soaps'. Seema, during the shoot, is attracted to Krishna after witnessing Krishna's gentleman behavior. She later confesses to Guru that she is in love with Krishna and is soon going to propose to him which upsets Guru. Krishna is more than happy after she proposes to him. On an attempt to bring Krishna's nature with women, he wantedly makes Sheila to go to the mall, Krishna and Seema are on a date. Terrified on looking at Sheila, he covers his identity and introduces Sheila to Seema as his wife much to Seema's horror. When Sheila gets suspicious, he blabbers that Seema is Guru's fiancé which makes Seema leave angrily. Realizing he doesn't love his wife anymore, he orders Guru to make Seema meet him which Guru reluctantly agrees. Seema is not convinced to meet Krishna. The duo bond and she agrees to meet Krishna once for Guru.

Seema is not convinced by Krishna's forgiveness. Krishna manipulates her and lies to her telling that his wife was cheating on him. A man, on Krishna's order,  comes and hugs Sheila from the back and she responds by smiling thinking as Krishna. But this not understood by  Seema, forgives him. Seema becomes Krishna's mistress. Guru tries to sabotage every moment Krishna wishes to meet Seema. Later, Krishna comes jealous of Guru's closeness to Seema and plans for an ad shoot abroad so as to secretly date Seema. Knowing this, Guru wantedly talks about his boss's affairs with women with Azhagappan so as Sheila's uncle, Gopal overhears it. Gopal is an unmarried middle aged man who is in search of his dream woman. Seema is convinced by Krishna that he is going to divorce Sheila and marry her. Guru makes Azhagappan dress up as an aunty, Lassi Latha, to prevent Seema go on a dinner date with Krishna. Krishna tries hard to make Guru move away. Gopal, much to azhagappan's horror, falls in love with Lassi Latha, his disguise. Krishna is terrified once Sheila also reaches the shoot location. Krishna decides to sleep with Seema and spikes her drink, which by mistake Sheila drinks it after she eats a spiked food given to her by Guru. Seema gets closer to Guru. They return back to Chennai. Krishna realises that Guru loves Seema and tries to take revenge on him. Gopal is shocked and faints when he finds that Lassi Latha is Azhagappan, who is his sister Suguna's lover.  Seema gets closer to Guru's family. She feels angry after Krishna insults Guru's family. She realizes that Guru loves her too and gets confused. Krishna makes Guru the boss of a company when Seema persuades Krishna and tells guru that he and Seema are going to a date to Kerala. This makes Guru understand that his love for Seema is greater than his company. Seema realists she loves Guru but felt attracted to Krishna only because of his money and her desire to become rich. She understands Krishna's nature when he overhears his conversation. Guru comes to Kerala and saves Seema and she confesses her love for him. Krishna fires Guru from his company.

Krishna leaves Seema asking if she has any sister for him to marry. Seema and Guru live happily and understand s that love is powerful than money.

Cast

Madhavan as Guru
Abbas as Krishna
Mamta Mohandas as Seema
Vivek as Aasana Azhagappan/"Lassi" Latha
Brinda Parekh as Sheila, Krishna's wife
M. S. Baskar as Gopal, Sheila's Uncle
Sona Heiden as Suguna, Gopal's sister
Mayilsamy as Director
Pattimandram Raja as Guru's father
Renuka as Guru's mother
Poovilangu Mohan as Seema's father
Meera Krishnan as Seema's mother
Aarthi as Guru's sister
Thambi Ramaiah as Krishna's lawyer
Manobala as Traffic Inspector
Mohan Raman as Sheila's father
Sharmilee as Sowbhagya, Suguna's aunt
Cell Murugan
Balaji
Shobhana
Bayilwan Ranganathan

Production
Following the release of his home production, Evano Oruvan, in December 2007, Madhavan announced his intentions on remaking the 1997 Hindi language film, Yes Boss. The director, a remake specialist, Selvah was assigned to direct the movie which was to be produced by KRG, one of the veteran producers and President of South Indian Film Chamber.

Following cast selection and story adjustions, the film had its launch on 2 May 2008, with only Madhavan and Mamta Mohandas among the cast attending at a small ceremony at Adyar, Chennai. Shooting for the film started at Chennai in May 2008 and continued in various locations in Kerala. Another schedule was filmed at overseas locations, primarily in Dubai, United Arab Emirates. The introductory song for Madhavan was shot at the AVM Studios in Vadapalani, Chennai with several extras, choreographed by Babu.

The casting process took four months for the director and producer to settle. Initially it was expected that Nayantara would appear opposite Madhavan in the lead role, however Nayantara opted out due to involvements in bigger projects such as Kuselan, Aegan and Villu. Sameera Reddy was briefly linked to the role, but eventually Mamta Mohandas claimed the lead female role, portraying a model. Jayaram was initially announced to portray a role in the film, but pulled out at the last moment and was replaced by Abbas, and another cast member is Vivek, whom both re-unite with Madhavan after the 2001 blockbuster, Minnale. Another actress, Brinda Parekh, was soon after signed up to play the role of Abbas's pair in the film. A string of supporting cast members were selected among those being Sona Heiden, Poovilangu Mohan, Mayilsamy, Pattimandram Raja, Manobala, M. S. Baskar, Meera Krishnan, and Aarthi.

Apart from Selvah, who directs the film, the cinematographer for the project is Senthil Kumar, whilst the editor is National Award winner V. T. Vijayan. The dialogues for Aziz Mirza's script is handled by L. Venkatesan, director of Jithan Ramesh starrer Nee Venunda Chellam and lyrics are written by Pa. Vijay, Kabilan and Pazhani Bharathi. Srikanth Deva is the music director for the film, renewing his association with Selvah, whom both were crew members of Selvah's previous venture, Thotta.

Release
After being completed but unreleased for one year, the film was released on 24 April 2009, opening to mixed reviews. Behindwoods wrote:"So that’s precisely the USP of Guru En Aalu. Comedy! If you don’t mind a few odd screen minutes while the lead characters trundle their way through a familiar script". Sify claimed that it is "nowhere near the original which was technically superior with super hit songs and locales".  Rediff wrote:"If you're looking for a re-creation of a feel-good candy-floss romance, then Selva's shoddy screenplay [sic] is likely to prove quite a drag". Hindu called it "typical commercial cocktail" and concluded that "If you have watched the original you are bound to be perplexed by unnecessary additions in the Tamil version that drag the film down to deplorable levels".

Legacy
6 years after the release of the film, Vivek and M. S. Bhaskar reprised their role of Latha and Gopal respectively, in the 2015 film Vai Raja Vai during a dream sequence at Goa.

Soundtrack

The film has six songs composed by Srikanth Deva collaborating with director Selva for second time after Thotta. Lyrics are by three eminent poets - Pa. Vijay, Kapilan and Pazhanibharathy whilst the songs are choreographed by Kalyan, Sridhar and Dinesh. The film's songs were released at a low-key function in Chennai on 26 September 2008. Majority of the BGM scores in this movie were lifted from popular Hindi movies like Kabhi Khushi Kabhi Gham, Salaam Namaste, No Entry and Om Shanti Om. "Spun" by Flipsyde is used in the song Chellame Chellame, and "Bebot" by The Black Eyed Peas forms the background score of the whole movie, "Ek Din Aap" from original Hindi film Yes Boss has been lifted here as "Kadhal Kannadiyil".

References

External links
Guru En Aalu at oneindia.in

2009 films
Tamil remakes of Hindi films
2000s Tamil-language films
Films scored by Srikanth Deva
Films directed by Selva (director)